The Karna Parva, or the Book of Karna, is the eighth of eighteen books of the Indian Epic Mahabharata. Karna Parva traditionally has 96 chapters. The critical edition of Karna Parv has 69 chapters

Karna Parva describes the appointment of Karna as the third commander-in-chief of the Kaurava alliance. The Parva recites how war begins to tire and frustrate everyone. This book describes how brutal war leads to horrifying behavior over the 16th and 17th day of the 18-day Kurukshetra War. This parva describes deaths of Dushasana, Banasena, Vrishasena, Susharma and finally Karna. At the end of the parva, Karna is killed in a fierce battle with Arjuna.

Karna Parva includes a treatise by Aswatthama which focuses on the motive of the deeds of human life. The crowning incident of this Parva is the final confrontation between Karna and Arjuna, in which Karna is killed.

Structure and chapters
This Parva (book) traditionally has 96 adhyayas (chapters). The following are the sub-parvas:

 1. Karna Parva (Chapters: 1–56)
 2. Karna-vadha Parva (Chapters: 57–96)

16th day war
 After learning of the deceptive way his father was killed, Ashwatthama became filled with wrath and invoked the celestial weapon called the Narayanastra, against the Pandavas. When the weapon was invoked, violent winds began to blow, peals of thunder are heard, and an arrow pierced every Pandava soldier. This had put fear into the Pandava army, but Krishna by stopping the troops advised that the army lay down all its weapons and surrender to the weapon. As himself being the incarnation of Narayana, he knew about the weapon, as the weapon only targets an armed person while ignoring unarmed ones. After getting their soldiers to disarm (including Bhima with some difficulty), the astra passed by harmlessly. Narayanastra failed to harm Arjuna and Krishna as they both were divine persons (Krishna himself is Narayana and Arjuna is Nara). When urged by Duryodhana to use the weapon again, desirous of victory, Aswatthama sadly responded that if the weapon is used again, it would turn on its user. Narayanastra destroyed one Akshauhini of Pandava army completely. After the use of Narayanastra, a terrible war between both armies took place. Ashvatthama defeated Dhrishtadyumna in direct combat, but failed to kill him as Satyaki covered his retreat.

 On 16th day of war, Karna was appointed to protect Dushyasana from clutches of Bhima. Bhima defeated by Karna in archery. Soon Karna picked up sword and rushed on to Bhima. Soon they engaged in sword fight, when Bhima was about to stab Karna, Karna's son Banasena came in aid of his father. On seeing Banasena, Bhima got angered as his own son Ghatotkacha was slain by Karna. Banasena challenged Bhima and soon attacked Bhima with mace. Bhima brutally but fairly killed Banasena in front of Karna. Bhima killed Banasena by hitting him several times on head, chest and abdomen regions. Seeing his son's fate; Karna quickly picked up a mace and attacked Bhima. Bhima asked Karna to take his son's body to perform funerals and later fight with Arjuna.

 By using an ordinary bow Ashwatthama fired millions of arrows at a time which resulted in the stupefaction of Arjuna himself. Then after some time he again overpowered Arjuna as Lord Krishna and Arjuna were bathed in blood but at last Arjuna pierced his steeds and steeds carried Ashwatthama away and also his weapons were exhausted.

 King Malayadhwaja of Pandya Kingdom was one of the mightiest warrior of Pandavas and on that day he fought brilliantly against Ashwatthama. After a long duel of Archery between them Ashwatthama made Malayadhwaja carless, weaponless and had obtained an opportunity to kill him on the spot but he spared him temporarily for more fight.Then Malayadhwaja proceeded against Ashwatthama on an elephant and sped a powerful lance which destroyed latter’s diadem.Then Ashwathama cut off the head and arms of Malayadhwaja and also killed 6 followers of Malayadhwaja. All the great warriors of Kauravas then applauded him for his act. 

 Then Bhima headed to kill Dussasana. Bhima engaged in duel with Dushasana. First they fought by means of archery. Bhima broke Dushasana's bow. Dushasana took sword, Bhima cut off sword. Bhima cut all weapons in similar manner till Dushasana took mace. When Dushasana took up mace, Bhima also took his mace. Soon both started mace duel with each other. Bhima beat Dushasana many times with his mace. Bhima broke Dushyasana's mace. Both of them began wrestling. Finally Bhima defeated and brutally killed Dussasana in front of Duryodhana. Bhima killed Dussashana by separating and detaching his hands from the body. Bhima beat Dussashana in heart region. Bhima squeezed blood from Dussasana's heart and dressed Draupadi's hair. Bhima also drank off remaining blood and fulfilled his oath.

17th day war
 In very early hours, after the sunrise; Trigartas and Samsaptakas engaged fight with Arjuna. Arjuna began to sweep the armies. Arjuna used his Nagastra. Then Partha slew them with his straight arrows. Indeed, all these warriors in that battle, aiming at whom Partha had invoked that foot-tying weapon, had their lower limbs encircled with snakes.  Then Susharma countered with his Sauparna astra. Thereupon numerous birds began to come down and devour those snakes. There was no man amongst them that could fight with Arjuna. Arjuna began to destroy all the troops. Beholding that slaughter, all of them remained perfectly inactive, without putting forth their prowess. Arjuna slew all Sampsaptakas and Trigartas. Arjun also killed King Susharma. Arjuna slayed 100,000 warriors. When Arjuna was involved in fight with Samsaptakas, Karna defeated the Pandava brothers Nakula, Sahadeva and Yudhishthira in battle but spared their lives as per promise he made to Kunti. Karna along with his son Vrishasena began slaying armies of Pandavas. Arjuna came into the place where Karna and Vrishasena were creating havocs. Karna was earlier involved in the killing of an unarmed Abhimanyu on the thirteenth day of the battle. First, Karna broke Abhimanyu's bow from behind, since it was impossible to face an armed Abhimanyu and then finally stabbed Abhimanyu along with other warriors. Remembering the injustified death of his son in which both Karna and Vrishasena had major role, Arjuna planned for revenge. Arjuna gave the challenge to Karna to save his son and attacked Vrishasena fiercely and fired four razor headed arrows, cutting off Vrishasena's bow, his two arms and then his head in front of Karna, who failed to protect his son. Karna became inconsolable after seeing his son's fate. He engaged a long duel with Arjuna. The much anticipated battle between Arjuna and Karna took place  fiercely. As the battle intensified, Arjuna pushed back Karna's chariot 10 steps backward every time by the energy of the arrows, but Karna failed to push Arjuna's chariot back. When questioned by Arjuna, Krishna said it is meant to be impossible for any human ever to push his chariot backwards because the chariot of Arjuna contains both Hanuman and Krishna, thus holding the entire weight of the universe. Although it was done by krishna so that arjuna doesn't becomes overconfident. Being pushed back by Arjuna, Karna began coming forward but then Karna's chariot wheel was trapped in the mud as a result of the curse he had received earlier from goddess Earth. At the crucial moment, he forgot the incantations to invoke Brahmastra, as a result of his guru Parashurama's curse. Karna got down from his chariot to free the wheel and asked Arjuna to pause, reminding him of the etiquette of war. But Krishna spurred Arjuna to attack Karna reminding the way Karna killed Abhimanyu by stabbing him from behind- which are against the rules of engagement of the war. Being spurred by Krishna, then Arjuna used Anjalikastra to kill Karna which cut the head of Karna, leading to his death. Arjuna had to kill Karna in such a kind of situation only because Karna had banes from Goddess Earth and poor brahmin. Earth Goddess cursed Karna that his chariot wheel gets struck in land which will lead to his death and a brahmin cursed Karna that Karna would die when he is weaponless as Karna killed his cow when it was helpless. In order to fulfill curses, Krishna spurred Arjuna to kill Karna in that situation.

English translations

Karna Parva was composed in Sanskrit. Several translations of the book in English are available. Two translations from the 19th century, now in public domain, are those by Kisari Mohan Ganguli and Manmatha Nath Dutt. The translations vary with each translator's interpretations.

Clay Sanskrit Library has published a 15 volume set of the Mahabharata which includes a translation of Karna Parva by Adam Bowles. This translation is modern and uses an old manuscript of the Epic.

Quotations and teachings

Karna Parva, Chapter 6:

Karna Parva, Chapter 69:

See also
Previous book of Mahabharata: Drona Parva
Next book of Mahabharata: Shalya Parva

References

External links
 Karna Parva, English translation by Kisari Mohan Ganguli
 Karna Parva, English translation by Manmatha Nath Dutt
 Le Mahabharata, Translation in French, by H. Fauche (Paris, 1868)
 Karna Parva in Sanskrit by Vyasadeva and commentary by Nilakantha (Editor: Kinjawadekar, 1929)
 Karna

Parvas in Mahabharata
Kurukshetra War